Zinash Tayachew (born 13 January 1978) is an Ethiopian politician, philanthropist and gospel singer. She is the wife of the Ethiopian Prime Minister Abiy Ahmed and the fourth First Lady of Ethiopia. Zinash is a devout Protestant Christian ministering at her church as a gospel singer.

Life and career
Zinash Tayachew was born on 13 January 1978, in the city of Gondar, Amhara Region, Socialist Ethiopia. Upon graduation from Fasiledes Secondary School in Gondar, Zinash Tayachew joined military service where she would meet her future husband, the current Prime Minister of Ethiopia, Abiy Ahmed Ali. Prior to her role as the First Lady, Zinash Tayachew lived in exile with their three daughters in Denver, Colorado.

Zinash and Abiy have three daughters, Deborah, Rakeb, and Amen. The couple adopted their 15 days old son named Million Abiy in August 2018.

See also 

 First Lady of Ethiopia

References 

1978 births
Living people
First ladies of Ethiopia
Ethiopian Protestants